Twenty:20 is a 2008 Indian Malayalam-language action thriller film written by Udayakrishna-Siby K. Thomas and directed by Joshiy. The film stars Mohanlal, Mammootty, Suresh Gopi, Jayaram and Dileep. The film was produced and distributed by actor Dileep through Graand Production and Manjunatha Release. The film was produced on behalf of the Association of Malayalam Movie Artists (AMMA) as a fundraiser to financially support actors who are struggling in the Malayalam film industry. All the actors in AMMA worked without payment in order to raise funds for their welfare schemes. 

The film features an ensemble cast, which includes almost all major artists in Mollywood. The music was composed by Berny-Ignatius and Suresh Peters while C. Rajamani provided background score. The film managed to secure third position (with 7 prints, 4 in Chennai) in Tamil Nadu's box office in its opening week. The total number of opening prints releasing inside Kerala was 117; outside Kerala, approximately 25 prints were released on 21 November 2014, including 4 prints in the US and 11 prints in the UAE.

Plot
Viswanathan Menon, a Supreme Court Chief Justice and his wife come home to celebrate Vishu with his children and grandchildren, and hopes to spend the remainder of his life in tranquillity. The big joint family arrives and prepares to celebrate through the weekend, but plans go awry when Menon's grandson Arun Kumar, a medical student in Bangalore, is accused of murdering a fellow student. SP, Antony Punnekkadan, who has a grudge against Menon's children, attempts to take Arun into custody. Arun goes into hiding, but Antony finds him and seizes him from the hideout. The Menon family hires ace criminal lawyer Ramesh Nambiar, who bails Arun out of prison. 

Vinod Bhaskar, a doctor and Professor of Medicine, wants to testify against Arun but is kidnapped by Karinkal Peethambaran, a thug hired by Menon's children. Arun gets murdered, and Punnekkadan arrests Devan, a poor trader who happened to be at the scene. Devan's sister and his mother tells Ramesh that Devan is innocent and that he is being framed by Punnekkadan. Ramesh takes the case, proves Devan's innocence in court, and Devan is released. Minutes after the release, Ramesh encounters Devan, who introduces himself as Devaraja Prathapa Varma, a crime boss. Devaraja and his assistants deceived Ramesh into believing that Devaraja was innocent. 

Devaraja reveals that he is the real killer and that he tricked Ramesh as retribution for saving Arun. Devaraja plans to avenge the brutal murder of his brother Karthik Varma, who was killed by Arun and his cousins Mahindran and Ganeshan. This triggers a feud between Devaraja and Ramesh. When Devaraja tries to kill the last two relatives involved in the crime, Ramesh sets a trap. Devarajan escapes, but is eventually arrested by SP Punnekkadan. Ramesh learns the truth about the murder at the Bangalore Medical College from Vinod Bhaskher, who is a teacher there and a close friend of Devarajan. Ramesh's sister Ashwathy was a student at the Bangalore medical college when she witnessed Arun killing a girl at the school. 

Arun, along with his two relatives Mahindran and Ganeshan, apprehendef Ashwathy, injected her with morphine to kill her. However, Ashwathy survived, but fell into a deep coma. Ashwathy's boyfriend Karthik attempts to save her, but is also killed. When Ramesh finds out Devarajan was actually trying to kill the perpetrators who killed Ashwathy, he is full of remorse, which triggers Devarajan about the warning by Ramesh that he would regret knowing the truth. Devarajan escapes from police custody with the help of a cop and kills Ganeshan. Ramesh and Devarajan kills Mahindran and Antony kills Madhavan. The case is abandoned when Antony lets them walk free, knowing that otherwise, they would escape anyway.

Cast

 Mohanlal as Devaraja Prathapa Varma
 Mammootty as Adv. Ramesh Nambiar
 Suresh Gopi as S.P. Antony Punnekkadan I.P.S.
 Jayaram as Dr. Vinod Bhaskar
 Dileep as Karthi/Karthik Varma
 Siddique as Madhava Menon
 Manoj K. Jayan as Mahindran
 Shammi Thilakan as Ganeshan
 Vijayaraghavan as Balan Menon 
 Indrajith Sukumaran as Arun Kumar, Madhava Menon's son
 Bhavana as Ashwathy Nambiar
 Sindhu Menon as Padmini, Mahendran's wife
 Gopika as Devi, Adv. Ramesh Nambiar's wife
 Karthika Mathew as Alice, wife of Antony Punnekkadan
 Kavya Madhavan as Ancy
 Mukesh as Circle Inspector Jayachandran Nair
 Jagadish as Police Constable Nakulan
 Jagathy Sreekumar as Sankarettan (Devan and Karthik's cousin)
 Sreenivasan as Constable Kunjappan
 Madhu as retired Justice Vishwanatha Menon
 Innocent as Kuttikrishnan
 Lalu Alex as DIG Krishnadas
 Bindu Panicker as Geetha 
 Maniyanpilla Raju as SI Gopi
 Radhika as Radhika, Ashwathy's Friend
 Kalpana as Para Mary
 Kalabhavan Mani as Karinakel Pappachan
 Suraj Venjaramood as Gumasthan Ramu
 Babu Antony as Vikram Bhai
 Madhu Warrier as Assistant of Devan
 Edavela Babu as Josuttan
 Baiju Santhosh as Satheesan
 Anil Murali as Surendran
 Lal as Adv. Radhakrishnan
 Janardanan as Ramakrishnapilla
 Bijukuttan as Ottu Murali
 Harisree Ashokan as Poottu Varkey
 Salim Kumar as S.P. Indhuchoodan
 Cochin Haneefa as Peruchazhi Vasu
 Indrans as Govindan
 Sai Kumar as Minister Mathai
 T. P. Madhavan as Minister's PA Francis
 Biju Menon as A.S.P. Jacob Eerali IPS
 Kaviyoor Ponnamma as Bharathi Amma
 Jyothirmayi as Jyothi
 Usha as Latha
 Sukumari as Leelamma
 Mamukkoya as Vallakkaran Khadar
 Baburaj as Stephen
 Madhupal as Shekharan Kutty
 Mala Aravindan as Kurup
 Guinness Pakru as a worker in the tea shop
 Babu Namboothiri as Justice Kaimal
 Nayanthara in a special appearance in a song
 Prithviraj Sukumaran in a special appearance in a song
 Jayasurya in a special appearance in a song
 Kunchacko Boban in a special appearance in a song
 Manikkuttan in a special appearance in a song
 Vijayakumar as Junior Advocate

Production
Twenty:20 was made as a fundraiser for the Association of Malayalam Movie Artists (AMMA). The script was written by Uday Krishna and Sibi K Thomas. As a producer, Dileep was the main investor in the project, and he bought the rights of the film for 40 million. He officially handed over the money to AMMA a year before. The film shooting officially started at a ceremony held in Hotel White Fort, Kochi, with Dileep handing over the advance to Joshi. The filming was primarily held in Kochi and Thiruvananthapuram. A song sequence in the film was shot in Mauritius. The shooting of the film started on 7 December 2007 and finished in October 2008.

Meera Jasmine, who was slated to act in the film opposite Dileep, dropped out, citing a shortage of dates. There were reports that the AMMA was planning a ban on her regarding the issue. However, no ban was pronounced and Meera Jasmine was replaced with Bhavana.

The High Court of Kerala issued a stay preventing the government's planned action of allowing a 50% premium to be charged for tickets in a case where the plaintiff argued that the state only had the right to offer tax breaks on the making of films.

Release

Theatrical
Twenty:20 was released on 5 November 2008.

Home media
Moser Baer home entertainment released the VCD and DVD of the movie in India.
Surya TV owns the broadcast rights for Twenty:20.

Reception

Box office

Twenty:20 opened at the external market on 21 November 2008 with approximately 25 prints, including 4 prints in the US, 11 prints in the UAE, and 7 prints in Tamil Nadu. The film completed 150 days in theatres.

Critical response
Sify.com described the ensemble cast as the "Mother of all multi-starrers".  The site called the film a "stylish, racy and never a dull moment super entertainer." The reviewer went on to write that the film "is a winner all the way" and that "it is a blockbuster in the making and is refreshingly fresh, innovative entertaining and highly recommended". Rediff.com rated the film 3/5, calling it "surprisingly good" and gave credit to the director Joshi for "designing a miracle". It also received the Asianet Film Award for Best Film.

Music

The audio launch of the film was held in a function at Mohanlal's own Hotel Travancore Court, Eranakulam. AMMA president and actor Innocent released the audio CD by handing it over to actress Manju Warrier, who was the wife of actor Dileep, the producer of the film. The music rights of the film were reportedly purchased for a record price by Manorama music. The music CD pack carries a bonus VCD of the video film The Making of Twenty:20. There are three songs in the album, one by composer Berny-Ignatius ("Sa re ga ma pa") and others by Suresh Peters.

Track listing
There are three tracks in the album: three vocals and the karaoke versions of them. The lyrics of the songs were penned by Gireesh Puthenchery.

References

External links
 

2008 films
2000s Malayalam-language films
Films shot in Mauritius
Indian action thriller films
Films with screenplays by Udayakrishna-Siby K. Thomas
Films scored by Berny–Ignatius
Films scored by Suresh Peters
Films directed by Joshiy
Films shot in Kochi
Films shot in Thiruvananthapuram
2008 action thriller films